Francisco Maria da Veiga, GCNSC, was a Portuguese judge and pro-monarchist.

Early life
He completed law in University of Coimbra at the age of 20 and practiced it before becoming a magistrate.

Career
In 1893, during the financial, social and political crisis that preceded the Lisbon Regicide and the 5 October 1910 revolution the Kingdom Minister João Franco made him a judge with enhanced powers to help maintain the monarchy.

He specially watched the press, republican activities and anarchists. In name of public order, he censored the anti-royal press, but most of his victims were found innocent specially because the attorney-general was the republican and Freemason Trindade Coelho.

Targeted by the press, he was caricatured with a police uniform and the blue pencil of censorship.

References 
 "Francisco Maria da Veiga (1852-1934)" (in Portuguese). Fundação Mário Soares. Retrieved 13 December 2013.
 "GeneAll.net - Francisco Maria Veiga". GeneAll. Retrieved 13 December 2013.

1852 births
1934 deaths
20th-century Portuguese judges
People from Guarda District
19th-century Portuguese judges
University of Coimbra alumni
Honorary Knights Commander of the Royal Victorian Order